Stevens Cooperative School is a private school for PreK 3 through 8th grade with campuses in Hoboken and Newport, Jersey City. Founded in 1949, Stevens is the oldest parent cooperative school in New Jersey, and a model of progressive education in action. Originally an informal playgroup for children of the faculty at Stevens Institute of Technology, the school has grown into a nursery, elementary and middle school with over 420 students. The Stevens community includes Hoboken, Jersey City, Weehawken, North Bergen, Secaucus, Union City, Bayonne, West New York, Cliffside Park and other NJ locations and Manhattan.

News, Press, Reviews of Stevens Cooperative School

Stevens Cooperative School names Dr. Sergio Alati, Head of School (Beginning July 2012)

History & Timeline

History and timeline references found on the Stevens Cooperative School .
 1949 Stevens Cooperative School was incorporated as a school for 3s and 4s.  After a number of years, it moved to Lott House, at 8th Street and Castle Point Terrace in Hoboken, where the nursery school remained until 2007.
 1973 Stevens starts its first Kindergarten program at St. Matthews Presbyterian Church at 9th Street and Hudson Street.
 1979 The School moves to St. John’s Lutheran Church at 3rd and Bloomfield Streets and adds a 1st grade and 2nd grade.
 1980 Stevens adds 3rd grade and 4th grade and moves St. Paul’s Episcopal Church at 820 Hudson Street. Families from all over Hudson County join the school’s population.
 1983 Stevens buys a building at 220 Willow Street to house the K-4th grade.
 1980s The expansion of the School allows for the hiring of many teachers from the Bank Street College of Education, one of the nation’s leaders in progressive education.  This practice continues today.
 1986 The school hires its first full-time educational director.
 1992 The school moves into the Rue Building at 3rd and Garden Streets, where 1st grade - 8th grade in Hoboken remain today.
 1995 Zoe L. Hauser begins her tenure
 Late 1990s Stevens expands to middle school, adding a 5th grade in 1997 and a 6th grade in 1998.
 2003 The school graduates its first 8th grade class.
 2003 Stevens moves its PreK and Kindergarten classes into a building a 301 Bloomfield Street, financing the purchase of the land with its first capital campaign.
 2005 Stevens opens a new campus at Newport in Jersey City with Kindergarten - 2nd grade, and the commitment to add one grade there per year.
 2007 A morning and afternoon 2s program is launched at the 301 Bloomfield Street facility.
 2007 Stevens moves its 3s, 4s and PreK/K students in Hoboken into a new facility at 333 River Street.
 2007 The Harrell Room, a science and media center, is installed on the second floor of 301 Bloomfield.
 2008 Stevens Newport Campus welcomes middle schoolers and has its first 5th grade class.
 2009 Stevens Newport Campus moves into a brand new, build to suit, 20,000 square foot space at the AquaBlu building within the Newport development.
 2010 Zoe L. Hauser celebrates 15 years as Head of School.
 2012 Dr. Sergio Alati named Head of School.
 2013 Josh Marks named Hoboken Campus Principal.
 2015 Shehla Ghouse named Newport Campus Principal.

Accreditation

Stevens is accredited by the New Jersey Association of Independent Schools, the Middle States Association Commission on Elementary and Secondary Schools, and the Independent Schools Admissions Association of Greater New York (ISAAGNY).

Buildings

Stevens Cooperative School has four buildings on two campuses in Hoboken and the Newport area of Jersey City.

References

External links
 
Data for Stevens Cooperative School, National Center for Education Statistics

Private elementary schools in New Jersey
Private middle schools in New Jersey
Hoboken, New Jersey
Schools in Jersey City, New Jersey
New Jersey Association of Independent Schools
Schools in Hudson County, New Jersey